Gabriel Omar Ramírez (born 29 June 1995) is an Argentine professional footballer who last played as a midfielder for Greek Super League 2 club AEL.

Career
Ramírez started in the youth ranks of Lanús, which preceded a short spell in 2015 with Talleres' academy prior to rejoining Lanús. He scored two goals  in five games for the Lanús U20s at the 2016 U-20 Copa Libertadores. In July 2016, Ramírez was loaned to fellow Argentine Primera División side Quilmes. He made his professional debut on 17 September during a 1–1 draw with Independiente. In the following December, he scored the first two goals of his senior career in league matches against Sarmiento and Temperley. In total, Ramírez featured twenty-two times for Quilmes. He returned to Lanús in 2017.

He was again loaned out two months later to rejoin Talleres. Six appearances followed prior to his departure in December. In January 2018, Ramírez rejoined Quilmes, now of Primera B Nacional, on loan. His first appearance of 2017–18 arrived in a tie versus Agropecuario on 5 February. Atlético de Rafaela signed Ramírez on a loan deal in the following July.

Career statistics
.

References

External links

1995 births
Living people
People from Corrientes
Argentine footballers
Argentine expatriate footballers
Association football midfielders
Argentine Primera División players
Primera Nacional players
Torneo Federal A players
Super League Greece 2 players
Club Atlético Lanús footballers
Quilmes Atlético Club footballers
Talleres de Córdoba footballers
Atlético de Rafaela footballers
Boca Unidos footballers
Club Atlético Atlanta footballers
Athlitiki Enosi Larissa F.C. players
Argentine expatriate sportspeople in Greece
Expatriate footballers in Greece
Sportspeople from Corrientes Province